Frost is a collection of mystery stories by author Donald Wandrei. It was released in 2000 by F & B Mystery in an edition of 1,100 copies of which 100 were signed by the editor and artist and released in a slipcase with Wandrei's Three Mysteries.  The stories features Wandrei's scientist detective I. V. Frost and originally appeared in the magazine Clues Detective.  It collects the first 8 stories, with the final 10 planned for a subsequent volume.  This never appeared. Haffner Press has put out a complete collection of I.V. Frost (2020).

References

2000 short story collections
Mystery short story collections
Fedogan & Bremer books